Sir William Henry Power,  (15 December 1842 – 28 July 1916) was a British medical doctor.

Biography
He was born in London, and served as Assistant Medical Officer and Medical Inspector for General Sanitary Purposes of the Local Government Board. The entomologist and lecturer of medicine, John Arthur Power was an uncle.

In January 1900, he was appointed Chief Medical Officer of England, and served as such until 1908.

In 1898 he was awarded the first Edward Jenner Medal of the Epidemiological Society of London. He was elected a Fellow of the Royal Society in 1895 and awarded their Buchanan Medal in 1907. He won the Bisset Hawkins Medal from the Royal College of Physicians in 1902.

He was appointed a Companion of the Order of the Bath (CB) in the November 1902 Birthday Honours list, and knighted as a Knight Commander (KCB) of the same order in 1908.

He died at Holly Lodge, East Molesey, Surrey, in 1916.

References

1842 births
1916 deaths
Medical doctors from London
Chief Medical Officers for England
Fellows of the Royal Society
Knights Commander of the Order of the Bath
British epidemiologists